Candor is a town in Montgomery County, North Carolina, United States. The population was 840 at the 2010 census. Candor is the home of the North Carolina Peach Festival, which is held every year on the third Saturday of July. The town's welcome sign reads: Welcome to Candor. Peach Capital.

History
Candor was so named for the settlers' honest dealings.

Geography
Candor is located at  (35.293032, -79.742423).

Demographics

2020 census

As of the 2020 United States census, there were 813 people, 335 households, and 266 families residing in the town.

2000 census
As of the census of 2000, there were 825 people, 280 households, and 204 families residing in the town. The population density was 691.2 people per square mile (267.7/km2). There were 299 housing units at an average density of 250.5 per square mile (97.0/km2). The racial makeup of the town was 79.03% White, 8.73% African American, 0.24% Native American, 0.36% Pacific Islander, 7.39% from other races, and 4.24% from two or more races. Hispanic or Latino of any race were 27.03% of the population.

There were 280 households, out of which 30.0% had children under the age of 18 living with them, 56.1% were married couples living together, 11.4% had a female householder with no husband present, and 27.1% were non-families. 26.8% of all households were made up of individuals, and 12.1% had someone living alone who was 65 years of age or older. The average household size was 2.76 and the average family size was 3.21.

In the town, the population was spread out, with 23.4% under the age of 18, 7.8% from 18 to 24, 27.2% from 25 to 44, 21.9% from 45 to 64, and 19.8% who were 65 years of age or older. The median age was 40 years. For every 100 females, there were 101.2 males. For every 100 females age 18 and over, there were 92.7 males.

The median income for a household in the town was $37,917, and the median income for a family was $42,000. Males had a median income of $27,031 versus $20,673 for females. The per capita income for the town was $15,107. About 8.3% of families and 14.4% of the population were below the poverty line, including 16.8% of those under age 18 and 6.6% of those age 65 or over.

References

External links
 Town of Candor

Towns in North Carolina
Towns in Montgomery County, North Carolina